Party of Labour is a name used by various political parties throughout the world.

 Party of Labour of Albania
 Party of Labour and of the People, in Argentina
 Party of Labour of Austria
 Belarusian Party of Labour, in Belarus
 Workers Party of Belgium
 Guatemalan Party of Labour
 Party of Labour of Iran (Toufan), in Iran
 Party of Labour (Mexico)
 Labour Party (Netherlands)
 Swiss Party of Labour
 Malian Party of Labour
 Party of Labour (Serbia)
 Party of Labour (Turkey)
 Party of Labor (Ukraine)
 German Partei der Arbeit, a Neonazi organisation later renamed Volkssozialistische Bewegung Deutschlands/Partei der Arbeit

See also
Labour Party (disambiguation)